The Andorran Cycling Federation or FAC (in Catalan: Federació Andorrana de Ciclisme) is the national governing body of cycle racing in Andorra.

The FMC is a member of the UCI and the UEC.

References

External links
 Andorran Cycling Federation official website

National members of the European Cycling Union
Cycle racing organizations
Cycling
Cycle racing in Andorra